D. Felipe da Silva (died 1644) was a Portuguese soldier in the service of Spain.

Felipe da Silva was the son of Dona Filipa da Silva (1550–1590), 4th Countess of Portalegre and of Don Juan de Silva (1528-1601), Spanish ambassador to the court of King Sebastian and Count of Salinas. His brother was D. Manrique da Silva, 1st Marquis of Gouveia, mordomo-mor of King John IV of Portugal and member of his privy council.

In 1638, da Silva was part of the War Council of Flanders, along with the Marquis of Mirabel and the Marquis of Cerralvo, Manuel Pimentel de Requesens Count of Feira, Claude de Rye, Baron of Valançon and Anthonie Schetz, Baron of Grobbendonk.

After the Portuguese revolution of 1 December 1640, he was held in custody at Burgos, being freed in 1643 after which he was ordered to proceed to Madrid where he was promoted to commander of the Spanish forces in Catalonia, despite his age and the fact that he suffered from gout.

He led the conquest of Monzon (Montsó) in 1643 and of Lérida (Lleida) in 1644. He died that same year.

Bibliography
 Campaña de Cataluña de 1644, Contiene la batalla, sitio y toma de Lérida y el sitio que el enemigo puso sobre Tarragona sin conseguirla dins de Colección de documentos Inéditos para la Historia de España, Tom 95 - Madrid, 1890

References

1644 deaths
Portuguese soldiers
Year of birth unknown
17th-century Portuguese people